Edward Carl Bald (1874–1946) was an American cyclist and automobile racing driver who was retroactively awarded the 1907 National Championship in 1951. He was also a champion bicycle racer in the 1890s, nicknamed "The Cannon."

As a cyclist, Bald rode and promoted Columbia Bicycles.  In 1904, Bald spent time at the Columbia factory learning about automobiles.  Late that year, he was part of the team which re-took the Chicago to New York record of 58 hrs, 35 min in a Columbia car.  Other drivers included Bert Holcomb (who was in charge of the run), Lawrence Duffie (Demonstrator of the Gasoline Dept of Electric Vehicle Company, which manufactured Columbia cars), Harry Sandol, and Ray Harroun.  Bald went on to race Columbia cars for several years in both road and track events.

After his racing career, he was an auto salesman from 1909 until he retired in 1925. He was born in Buffalo, New York on January 27, 1874 and died in Pittsburgh on July 1, 1946 at the age of 72. Bald married Joan Seeley (born October 4, 1873) in 1909 and had one son, Edward, Jr. on August 11, 1912.

References

External links
 On this page are two photos of Eddie Bald in 1904 as part of the team which re-took the Chicago-to-New York Record in a Columbia Car
 On this page are more photos of Eddie Bald in other Columbia cars, plus news items and a link to further material which includes bicycle photos

1874 births
1946 deaths
American male cyclists
Sportspeople from Buffalo, New York
Racing drivers from New York (state)